The transfer station Ricaurte is part of the TransMilenio mass-transit system of Bogotá, Colombia, opened in the year 2000.

Location
The station is located near downtown Bogotá, specifically at the intersection of Calle 13 with Carrera 27, right before the Carrera 30 bridge.

History
The station was opened in 2003 during the opening of the Américas-Calle 13 line. At the end of that same year, one side of the station was closed for the construction of a tunnel connection to the median of Avenida NQS. That portion was opened in 2005

The station has three entrances: at the traffic light on Avenida Calle 13 with Carrera 27, by the pedestrian bridge located on Avenida NQS with Calle 10, and through the building on the plaza located at the intersection of NQS with Calle 13.

The station is named Ricaurte due to the proximity of the neighborhood with the same name.

It is one of the two stations in the entire system that is part of more than one zone: zones  Américas and   NQS Central.

Station Services

Old trunk services

Main line service

See also

Bogotá
TransMilenio
List of TransMilenio Stations

TransMilenio